The World Women's Snooker Championship (known as the Women's World Open Championship from 1976 to 1981 and the World Ladies Snooker Championship from 1983 to 2018) is the leading tournament on the World Women's Snooker Tour. The winner receives the Mandy Fisher Trophy and a place on the main professional World Snooker Tour. The reigning champion is Siripaporn Nuanthakhamjan.

History
The tournament began as the Women's World Open Championship, which, as the most prestigious event for female players, was effectively the world championship. The first tournament was held in 1976, and the event was held again in 1980 and 1981. Staged from 1983 onward as the World Ladies Snooker Championship, the tournament was dominated over the next two decades by Allison Fisher (7 titles), Karen Corr (3 titles), and Kelly Fisher (5 titles), all of whom eventually moved to the United States to compete on the WPBA nine-ball pool tour.

From 1998 to 2003, Embassy sponsored the tournament, with the semi-finals and final taking place at the Crucible Theatre in Sheffield during the World Snooker Championship. After restrictions on tobacco advertising were introduced in 2003, the tournament lost its sponsorship and was not held in 2004. The most successful player since the tournament's revival in 2005 has been Reanne Evans, who has won the title 12 times, including ten consecutive victories between 2005 and 2014.

The 2017 championship was held in Toa Payoh, Singapore, the first time since 1995 that the tournament was held outside of the UK. The following year, the World Ladies Billiards and Snooker Association was rebranded as World Women's Snooker, and the tournament was renamed the World Women's Snooker Championship. In 2021, the tournament's trophy was renamed the Mandy Fisher Trophy. Fisher founded the World Ladies Billiards and Snooker Association in 1981, won the women's world title in 1984, and currently serves as president of World Women's Snooker.

The tournament was not staged in 2020 or 2021 due to the COVID-19 pandemic. After its resumption, the 2022 and 2023 tournaments were won by Thai players, Nutcharut Wongharuthai and Siripaporn Nuanthakhamjan respectively, ending a 19-year period in which every world title had been won either by Reanne Evans or Ng On-yee. Beginning in 2022, the women's world champion automatically received a two-year tour card to the main professional World Snooker Tour. If the tournament winner already holds a place on the professional tour, the next highest ranked player will receive a place.

The highest break in the history of the tournament is 127, made by Bai Yulu in the group stages of the 2023 event.

Finals

Statistics by player

Active players are shown in bold.

Notes

References

External links 
WWS website

 
Snooker amateur competitions
Recurring sporting events established in 1976
1976 establishments in England
World championships in snooker
Snooker